Brianna Lyston (born 24 May 2004) is a Jamaican sprint athlete who holds the 200m under-13s world record in 23.72s.

Lyston ran 22.53 (-2.2) at the 2022 Issa Boys and Girls Championship in Kingston, Jamaica. This made her the second fastest Under 20 female athlete from Jamaica. This also broke the Class 1 meeting record which was held by Simone Facey who ran a 22.71 back in 2004.

Lyston won her 100m heat in a personal best 11.14 (+0.7) at the 2022 Central Athletics Championships in Spanish Town, Jamaica to beat Tia Clayton.

Personal bests
Outdoor
100 metres – 11.14 (+0.7 m/s) (Spanish Town, Jamaica 15 MAR 2022)
200 metres – 22.53 (-2.2 m/s) (Kingston, Jamaica 9 APR 2022)
400 metres - 56.86 ( Spanish Town, Jamaica 18 FEB 2020)
4x100 metres – 42.58 (WR not ratified due to procedural error) Kingston, Jamaica 17 APR 2022)

References 

Jamaican female sprinters
2004 births
Living people
21st-century Jamaican women
World Athletics U20 Championships winners